Baron  was an early admiral of the Imperial Japanese Navy, active in the Russo-Japanese War, most notably at the Battle of Chemulpo Bay and the Battle of Tsushima. His name has sometimes been transliterated as "Uriu Sotokichi", or "Uriu Sotokitchi", a transliteration of older kana spelling. He was a lifelong proponent of better ties with the United States.

Biography
Uryū was the second son of a samurai in service of Daishōji Domain (present day Daishōji in Ishikawa prefecture). He attended a mission school in Tsukiji, Tokyo and was converted to Protestantism in 1874. He became one of the first cadets of the Imperial Japanese Naval Academy but did not graduate; instead, he was then sent to the US Naval Academy in Annapolis on 9 June 1875, returning on 2 October 1881

Commissioned as a lieutenant, Uryū served aboard various ships throughout the 1880s, including the corvette , the ironclad , and the sloop . On 23 July 1891, he assumed his first command: the gunboat . Promoted to captain in 1891, he was then posted as naval attaché to France from 5 September 1892 to 31 August 1896.

After the outbreak of the First Sino-Japanese War, Uryū briefly commanded the new cruiser , followed by his old ship Fusō.

However, this did not hurt his career, as he was appointed captain of Matsushima on 1 February 1899, and the battleship  on 16 June 1898.

He became a rear admiral and Chief of the Imperial Japanese Navy General Staff on 21 May 1900.

Uryū was promoted to vice admiral on 6 June 1904. During the Russo-Japanese War, he commanded the Second Squadron at the Battle of Chemulpo Bay which resulted in the destruction of the Russian cruiser  and gunboat .  For his war service, he was decorated with the Order of the Rising Sun (1st class) and the Order of the Golden Kite (2nd class) in 1906.

He was made commander of the Sasebo Naval District on 22 November 1906, he was ennobled with the title of danshaku (baron) under the kazoku peerage system on 21 September 1907.

Appointed commander of the Yokosuka Naval District on 1 December 1909, Uryū was made a full admiral on 16 October 1912. He was the official representative from Japan at the opening ceremonies for the Panama Canal in 1912. From 1922 to 1925, he served on the House of Peers in the Diet of Japan. He entered the reserve list in 1927, and died in 1937.

His grave is at Aoyama Cemetery in Tokyo.

Decorations
 1892 –  Order of the Sacred Treasure, 6th class  
 1896 -  Order of the Sacred Treasure, 5th class 
 1901 –  Order of the Rising Sun, 2nd class 
 1906 –  Grand Cordon of the Order of the Rising Sun 
 1906 –  Order of the Golden Kite, 2nd class  
 1937 –  Order of the Rising Sun with Paulownia Flowers

Notes

References

External links

1857 births
1937 deaths
Japanese Protestants
People of Meiji-period Japan
United States Naval Academy alumni
Imperial Japanese Navy admirals
Japanese naval attachés
Military personnel from Ishikawa Prefecture
Japanese military personnel of the First Sino-Japanese War
Japanese military personnel of the Russo-Japanese War
Kazoku
Members of the House of Peers (Japan)
Grand Cordons of the Order of the Rising Sun
Recipients of the Order of the Golden Kite, 2nd class
Recipients of the Order of the Rising Sun with Paulownia Flowers